is an annual set of awards sponsored by the Japan Lyricists' Association. Awarded since 1968. Over the years the award ceremony has been produced by NHK and NTV and now, since the 27th Awards, by TV Tokyo.

Grand Prix winning songs 
This is a list of songs that have won the Grand Prix. For details on awards in other categories, visit the official website of the Japan Lyricists' Association. The audience share data are from Video Research, for Kanto area.

References

External links 
 Japan Lyricist Award home page on the Japan Lyricist Association website

Japanese music awards
Japanese literary awards
Awards established in 1968
1968 establishments in Japan